Noel Kempff Mercado (February 27, 1924 in Santa Cruz de la Sierra, Bolivia – September 5, 1986 in the Serranía de Caparuch,  Bolivia) was a Bolivian biologist and environmentalist.

Kempff Mercado studied at the University of  Santa Cruz where he received his B.Sc. in 1946. During a field campaign in the Huanchaca National Park in 1986 he and several other scientists discovered a cocaine factory in the Bolivian forest. Kempff Mercado and most of the scientists were killed by the criminals. The Huanchaca National Park was renamed in 1988 as Noel Kempff Mercado National Park.

References
Laura Riley, William Riley Nature's strongholds: the world's great wildlife reserves Princeton University Press, 2005 
Museum Noel Kempff
Chronik Boliviens 1986-07-14

 Carlos D. Mesa Gisbert, Historia de Bolivia, Editorial Gisbert, La Paz, 2008, 7e éd., 739 p., p. 584

1924 births
1986 deaths
Bolivian scientists
Bolivian beekeepers
People murdered in Bolivia
People from Santa Cruz de la Sierra
Bolivian environmentalists
Bolivian people of German descent
1986 murders in Bolivia